The Uden War Cemetery is a Commonwealth War Graves Commission cemetery in Uden, the Netherlands. It was established in 1960 and is home to 703 graves from the Second World War.

History 
After the Battle of the Netherlands the country was occupied by the Germans. During the occupation allied casualties were buried in the parish priest's garden. In 1943 the municipality acquired the Roman Catholic Cemetery which was out of use since 1918. After the war about 100 graves were moved from the garden into the new cemetery. Many other graves from the region were also moved to the cemetery. Most of the buried are casualties from Operation Market Garden.

Cemetery 
The cemetery contains 703 graves and a Cross of Sacrifice, surrounded by a brick wall. The municipality of Uden has designated the cemetery a municipal monument.

Notable burials 
 Major Walter Long, 2nd Viscount Long
 Captain Prince Dimitri Galitzine

See also 
 World War II memorials and cemeteries in the Netherlands

References

External links

 

British military memorials and cemeteries
Canadian military memorials and cemeteries
Commonwealth War Graves Commission cemeteries in the Netherlands
Maashorst